Sandra Forgues (born 22 December 1969, in Tarbes), formerly known as Wilfrid Forgues, is a French slalom canoeist who competed as a male athlete from the late 1980s to the early 2000s (decade). In 2018, Forgues revealed publicly her identity as a trans woman.

Competing in three Summer Olympics, she won two medals in the C2 event with a gold in 1996 and a bronze in 1992.

Forgues also won four medals in the C2 event at the ICF Canoe Slalom World Championships with two golds (1991, 1997), a silver (1995), and a bronze (1993). She earned 5 more medals in the C2 team event (2 golds, 2 silvers and 1 bronze).

Forgues won the World Cup series in C2 in 1996 and 1997. She also won a silver medal in the C2 event at the 2000 European Championships.

Her partner in the boat throughout the whole of her career was Frank Adisson.

World Cup individual podiums

References

External links
 
 

Living people
Canoeists at the 1992 Summer Olympics
Canoeists at the 2000 Summer Olympics
Olympic canoeists of France
Olympic bronze medalists for France
Medalists at the 1996 Summer Olympics
1969 births
Sportspeople from Tarbes
Canoeists at the 1996 Summer Olympics
French female canoeists
Olympic gold medalists for France
Olympic medalists in canoeing
Medalists at the 1992 Summer Olympics
Medalists at the ICF Canoe Slalom World Championships
Transgender sportspeople
Transgender women
French transgender people
French LGBT sportspeople
LGBT canoeists